The 1996 Women's Perrier World Team Squash Championships were held in Petaling Jaya, Malaysia and took place from October 14 until October 19, 1996.

Results

First round

Pool A

Pool B

Pool C

Pool D

Quarter finals

Semi finals

Third Place Play Off

Final

References

See also 
World Team Squash Championships
World Squash Federation
World Open (squash)

World Squash Championships
1996 in women's squash
Squash tournaments in Malaysia
International sports competitions hosted by Malaysia
Squash